Golf (also known as Polish Polka, Polish Poker, Turtle, Hara Kiri and Crazy Nines) is a card game where players try to earn the lowest number of points (as in golf, the sport) over the course of nine deals (or "holes").

The game has little in common with the solitaire game of the same name.

Deal

Two or three players use a standard 52-card deck. If played with four or more, a double-deck of 104 cards can be used. 

Each player is dealt six face-down cards from a shuffled deck.  The remaining cards are placed face down to serve as the stock, from which the top card is taken and turned up to start the discard pile beside it. Players arrange their cards in two rows of three in front of them and turn any two of these cards face up. This arrangement is maintained throughout the game; players always have six cards in front of them.

Play

The objective is for players to reduce the value of the cards in front of them by swapping them for lesser value cards. After the last round, the highest score loses the game and the lowest score wins the game (see scoring below).

Beginning at the dealer's left, players take turns drawing single cards from either the stock or discard piles. The drawn card may either be swapped for one of that player's six cards or discarded. If the card is swapped for one of the face-down cards, the card swapped in remains face up. If the card drawn is discarded, the player can then choose to flip a card face up.

The round ends when a player has six face-up cards (sometimes the other players are given one final turn following this), after which scoring happens as follows:  

 Each Ace scores one point
 Each Two scores minus two points
 Each numeral card from 3 to 10 scores its face value
 Each Jack or Queen scores 10 points
 Each King scores zero points
 A pair of equal cards in the same column scores zero points for the column regardless of the rank of those cards

During play, it is not legal for a player to pick up a card from the discard pile and return it to the discard pile without playing it. A card picked up from the discard pile must be swapped with one of the current player's cards.

A full game is typically nine "holes" (hands), after which the player with the lowest total score is designated the winner. A longer game can be played to eighteen holes.

Variations
There is a multitude of variants in multiplayer golf. Some common ones include:

Single-deck golf
For two to four players. Rules are the same as in double-deck golf. Sometimes, jokers are not used.

Knocking
Golf can be played so that instead of ending the game automatically, a player must choose to "knock" instead of taking their turn. Remaining players then have one turn to draw a card to improve their hands and then scores are totaled and recorded on a running score sheet. This rule is more common for four-card golf.

Four-card golf
Suitable for 3-7 players, in four-card Golf each player receives four cards face down in a 2×2 grid and reveal two before play begins. Play proceeds similar to six-card golf. The end of a round is initiated by a player `knocking', after which other players get one final turn.

Nine-card golf
One or two decks are involved, depending on the number of players. One deck is adequate for 1-3 players, two or more decks are suggested for 4+ players. To begin the game, each player is dealt nine cards, laying out the cards face down in a 3x3 grid. The method or pattern for how the players layout their 3x3 grid is arbitrary, as long as the cards remain face down.

The game is played as six-card golf. Once any grid contains only face-up cards, the game is immediately ended, there are no further turns, and all players must flip all their face-down cards to determine their scores. Scoring is the same as six-card golf, with players having to form a full three-of-a-kind column to have that column score zero.

This process of game play continues for nine total games or until a player exceeds 50 points.

Optional rules of this version include:
 Horizontal and diagonal lines of three also score zero
 Playing with jokers in the game, valued at -4 points
 Every pair of adjacent (horizontal or vertical) equal cards scores zero
 If the player places four cards in a square pattern (i.e. 2x2 block) of the same face-point value, this results in a negative score (e.g. -25), for those four cards
 Instead of drawing a card, a player may choose to flip a card in their grid face up
 Playing until a player exceeds 100 points instead of 50

Alternative scoring
There are many variants for point values of cards, including:
Jokers are added to the deck and score -5, or some other negative number.
Jokers are +15 individually, or -5 as a pair.
Queens score 12, 13 or 20 points each.
Queen of spades scores 40 points, other Queens 10 each, and Eights are zero points.
One-eyed jacks are wild and automatically form a pair with an adjacent card (or complete a triplet in 9-card golf).
Jacks score zero, Queens 12, Kings 13.
Jacks are worth 20 points each and when a Jack is discarded, the following player loses a turn.
Twos are plus 2 instead of minus 2 (usually played in games without jokers).
Four of a kind wins the game (not the hole) automatically (usually played in 4-card golf).
A player who has a 9 card straight scores -12. This hand is considered a "hole in 1". If player does not obtain correct number of cards for a straight, then all points are added as usual.
A player may "shoot the moon" by getting the maximum 60 points. He or she gets 0 points for the round, and all other players get 60 points.
When playing 8-card, 4x2, four kings on one side = -16 points.
In "Cutthroat Golf" the kings are worth 15 points and if drawn from the deck can be traded for any other players up card. The card they receive must then be placed in their hand.

In some versions, making a pair or triple of cards of equal rank (sometimes vertically, sometimes horizontally and sometimes diagonally) reduces those cards' scores to zero.

Cambio

Variants known as Cambio, Pablo or Cactus include "power cards". When a power card is drawn from the stock, it can either be used for its normal value or discarded to activate its power. (If a power card is drawn from the discards, it must be played as its number.) A simple version of the game played in Malaysia has the following power cards:

A Jack allows a player to look at one of their own cards (without their opponent seeing it)
A Queen allows a player to look at one of their opponent's cards (again without their opponent seeing)
A King allows a player to swap one of their own cards with that of their opponent
A Joker allows a player to change the positions of their opponent's cards

John McLeod of Pagat.com speculates that these variants are Spanish in origin, as the game is recorded as being played by students in Spain, and many of its variant names are Spanish words (cambio meaning "exchange"). The game had a commercial release as Cabo in 2010 and is similar to the 1996 Mensa Select winner Rat-a-Tat Cat.

Powers

"Powers" is an escalated version of Cambio where every card is given some sort of additional ability. The game can only end after knocking, and all cards stay face down unless a power dictates that one should be turned up. You start the game with 6 cards, and can look at any two of them, with the rest staying hidden until you swap them or look at them with a power. 

On your turn, you take the top card, and put it into your deck without looking at the card with which you want to swap it, and discard. Or, you can discard the card you have drawn straight away, and instead use the power of the card instead. 

The abilities are as follows:

The Black King is the only card which can have its power applied when in a player's set.

Knocker's penalties and bonuses
Some play Golf and its variations such that that a player who knocks (turns over all cards first) but doesn't end with the lowest score is penalized:
Knocker adds a penalty of 10 or 20 points, or...
Knocker's score for the hand is doubled with 5 points added, or...
The knocker takes a score equal to the highest scoring player for that hand, or...
Knocker adds twice the number of people playing.

If the knocker's score is lowest, some play with a bonus:
Knocker scores zero instead of a positive score, or...
Knocker's score is reduced by the number of people playing.

References

External links
 Rules of Card Games: Golf

American card games
Year of introduction missing
Draw and discard games

ja:ゴルフ (トランプ)
sv:Golf (patiens)